Jeļena Ostapenko defeated Anett Kontaveit in the final, 6–3, 6–3, to win the women's singles tennis title at the 2021 Eastbourne International. By winning her fourth career WTA Tour singles title, Ostapenko became the tournament's third wildcard champion, following Monica Seles (1996) and Julie Halard-Decugis (2000).

Karolína Plíšková was the defending champion from when the event was last held in 2019, but she lost in the first round to Camila Giorgi. As a result, Plíšková exited the top 10 of the WTA rankings for the first time since September 2016.

Seeds

Draw

Finals

Top half

Bottom half

Qualifying

Seeds

Qualifiers

Lucky losers

Qualifying draw

First qualifier

Second qualifier

Third qualifier

Fourth qualifier

Fifth qualifier

Sixth qualifier

References

External links 
 Main draw
 Qualifying draw
 Official website
 WTA Website

Eastbourne International - Singles
2021 Women's Singles
2021 in English tennis